The 2015 Mr. Olympia contest was an IFBB professional bodybuilding competition that was held on September 19–21, 2015, in Las Vegas, Nevada. It was the 51st Mr. Olympia competition celebrated. Other events at the exhibition included the 212 Olympia Showdown, Ms. Olympia, Fitness Olympia, Figure Olympia, Bikini Olympia, Women's Physique Showdown, and Men's Physique Showdown contests.

Results

See also
 2015 Ms. Olympia
 2015 Men's Physique Showdown

References

External links 
 

 Mr Olympia: Through the Years
 2015
Mr Olympia
2015 in bodybuilding